William Miller Vinton (April 27, 1865 – September 3, 1893), was a pitcher in Major League Baseball.

Vinton was the star pitcher and captain of the Andover baseball team in the early 1880s. He then attended Yale University and played ball there before turning professional.

In 1884, Vinton joined the National League's Philadelphia Quakers. He was the team's best pitcher, posting a 10-10 record with a 2.23 earned run average. Vinton started off slow in 1885 and finished off that season with the Philadelphia Athletics. His career major league record was 17-19.

Vinton returned to Yale and graduated in 1888. He then pitched for the New England League's Lowell Chippies and went 2-0 with a 1.50 ERA. The following season, he went to the Minneapolis Millers.

Vinton died in 1893, at the age of 28 from Cholera.

References

External links

1865 births
1893 deaths
19th-century baseball players
Major League Baseball pitchers
Philadelphia Quakers players
Philadelphia Athletics (AA) players
Lowell Chippies players
Minneapolis Millers (baseball) players
Baseball players from Massachusetts
People from Winthrop, Massachusetts
Yale University alumni